The River Hun is in the west of the county of Norfolk, in England. Its source is in the grounds of Hunstanton Park. Its mouth can be found on the North Sea near Holme-next-the-Sea.

In the 11th century it was known as 'Esten broke' (i.e. Esten brook).

References

Hun